Pierre-François-Léonard Fontaine (20 September 1762 – 10 October 1853) was a neoclassical French architect, interior decorator and designer.

Life and work
Starting in 1794 Fontaine worked in such close partnership with Charles Percier, originally his friend from student days, that it is difficult to distinguish their work. Together they were inventors and major proponents of the rich and grand, consciously archaeological versions of neoclassicism we recognize as Directoire style and Empire style. 

One of their major collaborations was the Arc de Triomphe du Carrousel. Fontaine, significantly, was also the architect of the Galerie d'Orléans, rebuilt in 1830 on the site of the former Galeries de Bois, in Paris.

Fontaine was born at Pontoise, Val-d'Oise and died in Paris. Following Charles Percier's death in 1838, Fontaine designed a tomb in their characteristic style in the Pere Lachaise Cemetery. Percier and Fontaine had lived together as well as being colleagues. Fontaine married late in life and after his death in 1853 his body was placed in the same tomb according to his wishes.

See also
Interior designer
 Neoclassicism in France

References

External links

Percier and Fontaine
Percier and Fontaine Collection



18th-century French architects
19th-century French architects
1762 births
1853 deaths
People from Pontoise
French neoclassical architects
École des Beaux-Arts alumni
Prix de Rome for architecture
Burials at Père Lachaise Cemetery
Members of the Académie des beaux-arts
Recipients of the Pour le Mérite (civil class)
People associated with the Louvre